Yuri Antonov may refer to:

 Yuri Antonov (diplomat), Russian diplomat and ambassador
 Yuri Antonov (musician) (born 1945), Russian composer, singer and musician